Asad Ghanma (14 February 1930 – 18 July 2006) was a Jordanian Christian General. From the town of Al Hisn in northern Jordan, Ghanma served as major and commander of the 48th Infantry Battalion of the Jordanian army during 1967 Arab-Israeli War and the Battle of Karameh. After the 1967 war, he was promoted to brigadier general and remained in the Jordanian Armed Forces until retirement. He is well known for his role in the Samu Incident.

Samu Incident
Asad Ghanma was the commander of the 48th Infantry Battalion of the Jordanian army during the Samu Incident, which was the first Jordanian force to arrive at the battlefield. At the time of the Israeli raid into Samu, the Jordan's troops were strained, having been deployed across the 600-kilometer border with Israel and Ghanma's unit was the only one present in Samu's vicinity. The Israeli force consisted of eleven Centurion tanks, fifty armored half-tracks and 500 paratroopers and was backed by Ouragan bombers and eight field guns from the Israeli side of the border to counter any potential Jordanian armored vehicles or artillery.

As the Israelis entered Samu and surrounding villages, Ghanma's forces, divided into three companies headed directly towards the Israelis' blocking position and were intercepted northwest of Samu. Two other Jordanian companies were also intercepted from the northeast, but a Jordanian platoon managed to enter the town and engaged in close quarter fighting with the Israelis until the latter routed them. Fifteen Jordanian soldiers and three civilians were killed, 54 were wounded and much of Samu's buildings and infrastructure were heavily damaged or destroyed. An Israeli commander was killed and ten soldiers wounded. After the battle, Asad Ghanma received the Medal of Bravery from the King Hussein, for his role in the battle.

References

Bibliography

1930 births
2006 deaths
Jordanian generals
Eastern Orthodox Christians from Jordan
People from Al Husn